The Exeter Street Theatre is a Richardsonian Romanesque building at the corner of Exeter and Newbury Streets, in the Back Bay section of Boston, Massachusetts. It was built as the First Spiritual Temple, 1884–85, by architects Hartwell and Richardson. For seventy years, from 1914 to 1984, it operated as a movie house. It now houses the Kingsley Montessori School.

History

"Wealthy socialite Mrs. [Marcellus Ayer] (Hattie M. Ayer) and her friends" organized the conversion in 1914 of church into cinema; Clarence Blackall designed the renovation. It "could accommodate 900 patrons." Proprietors and overseers included Viola and Florence Berlin, and Neil St. John Raymond.  The Working Union of Progressive Spiritualists continued to meet in the building's lower auditorium until 1974, when the congregation relocated to neighboring Brookline (and subsequently to Harwich, on Cape Cod), and they and/or Hattie Ayer sold the theater operation and building.

After the theatre closed in 1984 amidst popular cultural anguish and bottom-line real-estate concerns, the building has been deployed for a variety of mostly commercial purposes. It was occupied by Conran's housewares retailer and Waterstones booksellers. By 1988 "the Exeter Street Theatre building [housed TGI] Friday's Restaurant and an office complex." Business consultants Idealab leased space in the building from 2000 to 2003. In 2005 it became the Kingsley Montessori School.

One of the cinema's electric signs, scrapped in 1985, was acquired by collector Dave Waller.

John Cheever's short story "The President of the Argentine" mentions the Exeter Street Theatre.

Gregory Mcdonald's second book in the Fletch series Confess, Fletch (1976) mentions an Alec Guinness Saturday matinee double feature of The Lavender Hill Mob and The Man in the White Suit at the Exeter Street Theatre.

Screenings

1910s
 The Foundling
 Tess of the Storm Country

1920s
 A Virtuous Vamp
 Haunting Shadows
 Robert Z. Leonard's Stronger Than Death
 Live Sparks
 Passion Flower
 Just Out of College
 Sowing the Wind
 Haunted Spooks
 Pink Gods
 The Man Who Saw Tomorrow
 East is West

1960s
 The Endless Summer

1970s
 The Rocky Horror Picture Show

1980s
 Lynne Littman's Testament
 The Leopard
 "The Man Who Skied Down Everest"

References

Further reading
 "Boston time capsule opened after 100 years." Bangor Daily News - September 23, 1985

External links

 Flickr. Photos of the building, 1984
 Exterior
 Exterior
 Sign holder
 Interior
 Stained glass window, interior

1914 establishments in Massachusetts
1984 disestablishments in Massachusetts
Cultural history of Boston
20th century in Boston
Back Bay, Boston
Former cinemas in the United States
Religious buildings and structures completed in 1885
Hartwell and Richardson buildings